Bert Kramer (October 10, 1934 – June 20, 2001) was an American actor, who was born in San Diego. He appeared in many different television shows including Kojak, The Bionic Woman, The Rockford Files, Dallas, Dynasty, Full House, M*A*S*H, and Matlock.

He is probably best known for playing Alex Wheeler on the soap opera Texas, a role he played from 1980 to 1981. He also portrayed the same character on Texas's parent show Another World for a short time in 1980.

Prior to his role of Alex Wheeler, he played blue collar patriarch, Mike Fitzpatrick on the 1977 short-lived drama series, The Fitzpatricks, which also starred Clark Brandon, Jimmy McNichol and Helen Hunt. From 1984 to 1985, he played the role of Brent Davis on The Young and the Restless.

In 1986, he starred in a Garry Marshall financed teleplay called Four Stars, alongside actress Julie Paris. The film was directed by Happy Days actress and talent manager Lynda Goodfriend. During this period, he made a number of national television commercials, including a "Good to the Last Drop" Maxwell House spot. He voiced a goblin in the film Little Nemo: Adventures in Slumberland in 1992.

Death
Kramer died of melanoma in Los Angeles on June 20, 2001, at the age of 66.

Filmography

References

External links

Clips from Texas episodes

1934 births
2001 deaths
American people of German descent
American male soap opera actors
American male stage actors
20th-century American male actors
Deaths from melanoma
Deaths from cancer in California